Hapoel al-Ittihad Nazareth is an Arab-Israeli football club based in Nazareth. The club currently plays in Liga Gimel Jezreel division.

History
The club was founded in 1987 as a youth club and as the youth players grew, the club opened a senior team and joined Liga Gimel, where the club played ever since. The club never promoted from Liga Gimel and never made it to the advanced stages of the Israel State Cup.

External links
Hapoel al-Ittihad Nazareth  The Israel Football Association 
ادي كرة القدم الاتحاد الناصرة Official Facebook page 

Arab Israeli culture
Nazareth
Nazareth
Association football clubs established in 1987
1987 establishments in Israel
Sport in Nazareth